Terebralia is a genus of sea snails, marine gastropod mollusks in the family Potamididae.

Species
Species within the genus Terebralia include:

 Terebralia palustris (Linnaeus, 1767)
 Terebralia semistriata (Mörch, 1852)
 Terebralia sulcata (Born, 1778)

References

 Brandt, R. A. M. (1974). The non-marine aquatic Mollusca of Thailand. Archiv für Molluskenkunde. 105: i-iv, 1-423

External links
 Swainson, W. (1840). A treatise on malacology or shells and shell-fish. London, Longman. viii + 419 pp

Potamididae